Daniel Thomas Murray (19 December 1912 – 10 November 1992) was an Australian rules footballer who played for Fitzroy in the Victorian Football League (VFL).

Family
The son of Thomas Joseph Murray (1875-1947), and Ellen Murray, née Cameron, née Grist (1874-1961), Daniel Thomas Murray was born at Colac, Victoria on 19 December 1912.

He married Eileen May Dowdle (1913-1998) in 1933. Their son, Kevin later played 300 games for Fitzroy (its only 300 game player) and was inducted into the Australian Football Hall of Fame as a legend.

Football
Murray was a halfback and first appeared for Fitzroy in 1933. He left to play with Prahan from 1934 to 1938, then returned to Fitzroy in 1938. Murray was suspended for 10 weeks by the VFA Tribunal in June 1937 on a kicking charge, which resulted in him missing out on playing in Prahran's 1937 VFA premiership.

Murray was appointed as coach of the Horsham in early 1939, along with secure employment at the Horsham furniture store of Patersons Pty Ltd.

Fitzroy refused to clear him. Murray played for Fitzroy in round one, but then informed Fitzroy officials that he would be staying in Horsham. Murray was forced to resign as coach of Horsham and was replaced by former Footscray player, Bernie O'Brien. Murray was finally cleared to Horsham in early July 1939. 

Murray was appointed as coach of Horsham FC in November, 1939 for the 1940 season. In March 1940 Horsham FC decided to continue on for the season with Murray as coach at £5 per week.

After Horsham's 1940 season was shortened due to WW2, Murray returned to Melbourne to play the second half of the season with Fitzroy, after Horsham lost the Wimmera Football League preliminary final.  

Murray continued to play with Fitzroy in the early 1940's and was a reserve in their 1944 VFL premiership side.

Murray was appointed to the Fitzroy FC committee in 1947 and was also their chairman of selector's. 

Murray was captain-coach of Albury in 1948, losing the Ovens and Murray Football League grand final to North Albury. Murray returned to live in Melbourne in late September, 1948.

Military service
Murray also served in the Royal Australian Air Force during World War II.

References

External links

Dan Murray's playing statistics from The VFA Project
2004 obituary of Maurie Hearn, mentioning Clen Denning and Laurie Bickerton as the surviving members of the Maroons' 1944 side

1912 births
1992 deaths
Fitzroy Football Club players
Fitzroy Football Club Premiership players
Prahran Football Club players
People from Colac, Victoria
Australian rules footballers from Victoria (Australia)
One-time VFL/AFL Premiership players
Royal Australian Air Force personnel of World War II
Fitzroy Football Club administrators
Albury Football Club coaches
Military personnel from Victoria (Australia)